Kimberley Walsh (born 1980) is a British slalom canoeist who competed at the international level from 1997 to 2006.

She won a silver medal in the K1 team event at the 2005 ICF Canoe Slalom World Championships in Penrith, west of Sydney.

References

British female canoeists
Living people
1980 births
Medalists at the ICF Canoe Slalom World Championships